This is a list of Pakistan Cricket lists, an article with a collection of lists relating to the Pakistan Cricket team.

Teams

Stadium

Cricketers

Player statistics

Batting
List of international cricket centuries by Mohammad Yousuf
List of international cricket centuries by Younis Khan
List of international cricket centuries by Inzamam-ul-Haq
List of international cricket centuries by Saeed Anwar
List of international cricket centuries by Javed Miandad

Bowling

 List of international cricket five-wicket hauls by Waqar Younis
 List of international cricket five-wicket hauls by Wasim Akram
 List of international cricket five-wicket hauls by Imran Khan
 List of international cricket five-wicket hauls by Saqlain Mushtaq
 List of international cricket five-wicket hauls by Abdul Qadir
 List of international cricket five-wicket hauls by Shoaib Akhtar
 List of international cricket five-wicket hauls by Danish Kaneria

Records

Test
 List of Pakistan Test cricket records
 List of Pakistan cricketers who have taken five-wicket hauls on Test debut

One-day International
 List of Pakistan One Day International cricket records

Twenty20
 List of Pakistan Twenty20 International cricket records

By ground
 List of international cricket centuries at Gaddafi Stadium
 List of international cricket centuries at the National Stadium

External links
 Cricinfo

 
Pakistan in international cricket